2009 Avispa Fukuoka season

Competitions

Player statistics

Other pages
 J. League official site

Avispa Fukuoka
Avispa Fukuoka seasons